Levi is the reincarnation of the gospel choir God's Property (known for the 1997 Kirk Franklin hit "Stomp").  Under the direction of singer-songwriter and music producer Myron Butler, the group gained a Grammy nomination for its debut release Set Me Free and critical acclaim for its second album, Stronger.

Biography

Discography

Albums
Set Me Free – November 8, 2005 (#18, US)
Stronger – August 28, 2007
Revealed – March 30, 2010

Singles
"Set Me Free" – October 25, 2005
"Set Me Free" (3-track single) – June 6, 2006
"Set Me Free"
"Redeemed"
"That Place"
"Stronger" – July 19, 2007

Filmography
 Stronger DVD October 2, 2007

Awards

References

American gospel musical groups
Musical groups established in 2002
2002 establishments in Texas